The 2nd Presidents Cup was held between September 13 and 15, 1996. It was played at the Robert Trent Jones Golf Club in Gainesville, Virginia, USA. The United States team won the competition by a margin of 16–15. The honorary chairman was former President of the United States George H. W. Bush.

Format
Both teams had 12 players plus a non-playing captain. On the first and second day four-ball was played in the morning and foursomes were played in the afternoon. On the third day only singles were played.

Teams

OWGR as of September 8, 1996, the last ranking before the Cup

Friday's matches

Morning four-ball

Afternoon foursomes

Saturday's matches

Morning four-ball

Afternoon foursomes

Sunday's matches

Singles

Individual player records
Each entry refers to the win–loss–half record of the player.

United States

International

External links
Official scores in 2015 Media Guide

Presidents Cup
Golf in Virginia
Presidents Cup
Presidents Cup
Presidents Cup
Presidents Cup